Frederick Charles Lough (1916–2002) was a U.S. Army Brigadier General. He was a Lieutenant Colonel (Signal Corps) during World War II and received a Legion of Merit award for exceptionally meritorious conduct. He was also a recipient of the Distinguished Service Medal.

Education 
Durfee High School in Massachusetts
 Graduated from the U.S. Military Academy at West Point with a B.S. degree in 1938.
In 1949, Lough earned an LL.B. degree from Columbia University.
In 1959, he graduated from the Industrial College of the Armed Forces.

Career
On June 14, 1938, Lough was commissioned as a second lieutenant in the Signal Corps. In 1941, he was sent to London where he later joined General Dwight D. Eisenhower's staff planning for the Africa campaign.

In 1943, Lough assumed command of the 63rd Signal Battalion in Italy. He was awarded the Legion of Merit with one oak leaf cluster for his World War II service. After earning his law degree, Lough transferred to the Judge Advocate General's Corps on March 29, 1951.

Teaching
Associate Professor of Law at West Point (1960)
Head of the Law Department West Point (1963)

After retiring from the Army as a brigadier general in 1977, he joined the law firm of Ropes and Gray in Boston.

Awards and decorations
 Legion of Merit
 Distinguished Service Medal

Personal
Frederick Lough, born in Massachusetts. He attended Durfee High School in Massachusetts. Lough was married to Marguerite and together they had two children: Frederick and Elizabeth. They lived in Osterville, Massachusetts in his later years. After his death at Cape Cod Hospital in Hyannis, he was buried at the West Point Cemetery.

References

External links 
West Point

1916 births
2002 deaths
People from Fall River, Massachusetts
United States Military Academy alumni
Military personnel from Massachusetts
United States Army personnel of World War II
Recipients of the Legion of Merit
Columbia Law School alumni
Dwight D. Eisenhower School for National Security and Resource Strategy alumni
United States Military Academy faculty
United States Army generals
Recipients of the Distinguished Service Medal (US Army)
People from Osterville, Massachusetts
Burials at West Point Cemetery
20th-century American memoirists